Andriy Kulakov (born 28 April 1999) is a Ukrainian professional footballer who plays as a forward for Shakhtar Donetsk.

Career
Kulakov is a product of FC Metalist Kharkiv football academy in Kharkiv.

He played in Ukrainian Youth Football League in 2012-2016 for youth teams of FC Metalist Kharkiv. Since 2016 he plays in Ukrainian Premier League Reserves (UPL reserves) for U-19 and U-21 teams of FC Shakhtar Donetsk, to which he transferred in 2016.

Kulakov has been a scorer for Shakhtar youth squad in the UEFA Youth League in 2017–18 and 2018–19 seasons. He also became a top-scorer in the 2018–19 Ukrainian Premier League Under-21 competitions.

Career statistics

Club

References

External links
 

1999 births
Living people
Ukrainian footballers
Ukrainian expatriate footballers
Ukraine youth international footballers
Association football midfielders
FC Shakhtar Donetsk players
FC Mariupol players
Tuzlaspor players
Ukrainian Premier League players
Expatriate footballers in Turkey
Ukrainian expatriate sportspeople in Turkey
Sportspeople from Luhansk Oblast